Nemanja Protić (born August 13, 1986) is a Serbian professional basketball player for Zlatibor. He is a 1.82 m (6 ft 0 in) tall point guard.

Playing career 
In April 2022, Zlatibor won the ABA League Second Division for the 2021–22 season following a 78–73 overtime win over MZT Skopje Aerodreom.

References

External links
 Nemanja Protić at aba-liga.com
 Nemanja Protić at eurobasket.com 
 Nemanja Protić at euroleague.net

1986 births
Living people
ABA League players
Basketball League of Serbia players
Basketball players from Čačak
BC Khimik players
BC Levski Sofia players
BC Nizhny Novgorod players
EWE Baskets Oldenburg players
KK Borac Čačak players
KK Budućnost players
KK FMP (1991–2011) players
KK Metalac Valjevo players
KK MZT Skopje players
OKK Spars players
KK Zlatibor players
Point guards
Petrochimi Bandar Imam BC players
Serbian men's basketball players
Serbian expatriate basketball people in Bulgaria
Serbian expatriate basketball people in Bosnia and Herzegovina
Serbian expatriate basketball people in Germany
Serbian expatriate basketball people in Hungary
Serbian expatriate basketball people in Iran
Serbian expatriate basketball people in Montenegro
Serbian expatriate basketball people in Russia
Serbian expatriate basketball people in North Macedonia
Serbian expatriate basketball people in Turkey
Serbian expatriate basketball people in Ukraine
Universiade medalists in basketball
Universiade gold medalists for Serbia
Medalists at the 2009 Summer Universiade